The Memphis River Parks Partnership (MRPP), known as the Riverfront Development Corporation (RDC) until being renamed in April 2018, is a nonprofit organization that manages and develops the various riverfront parks and amenities located along the Mississippi River in Memphis, Tennessee, on behalf of the city government.

History
The Riverfront Development Corporation (as the organization was called until changing its name in 2018) was founded in 2000. Under its contract with the city, the organization maintains and develops the five miles of parks along the Mississippi River in Memphis. The RDC's largest project, the construction of a new dock called Beale Street Landing to be used by cruise ships and other vessels stopping in Memphis, was troubled by constant delays and costs far exceeding the original allotted budget. Beale Street Landing finally opened in June 2014, but public confidence in the corporation was already shaken, with criticism of the RDC piling up from organizations like the nonprofit, volunteer organization Friends for Our Riverfront. This negative public image, compounded by regular budgetary issues preventing the corporation from taking on more effective and ambitious plans towards improving riverfront amenities, led the RDC to rebrand itself as the Memphis River Parks Partnership, as part of a larger effort to revitalize the organization. This revitalization effort, launched by Carol Coletta upon her becoming CEO of the organization in April 2018, centered upon the implementation of the Memphis Riverfront Concept, which "calls for a series of small, elegant, connected moves along the riverfront that maximize the parks already in place and lay the groundwork for catalytic change in downtown and adjacent neighborhoods." Part of the plan included a new "River Line" trail, which would connect the five riverfront park districts located around the city.

Upon its inception, the Partnership made many fast changes including bringing a vibrant new program schedule to the riverfront. New events included yoga, Skate Nights and Full Moon Kayaking. Progress on the riverfront concept also moved quickly. In November 2018, the first projects, River Garden and River Line were completed. River Garden was formerly Jefferson Davis Park, then Mississippi River Park when the Confederate names were removed. The new park brought native plants, a pavilion and play/climbing structure and even life-sized birds nests to what was formerly a wide open field. Parts of the park were designed and built by classes from Shelby County Schools.

Controversy surrounding the organization resumed in May 2019, when the MRPP unveiled a 60 million dollar plan to redesign Tom Lee Park. The plan drew criticism from organizers and fans of the Memphis in May music festival (held annually in the park), who claimed that the park's redesign was aimed at making it more pedestrian-friendly while simultaneously making it less suited to large crowds, essentially forcing the festival out of its traditional venue. Meanwhile, park supporters claimed that the new park would be both an improved experience for the public outside of festival season and maintain the ability to host large-scale events. 

The dispute between the MRPP and Memphis was resolved in December 2019 following a months-long mediation process overseen by retired Tennessee Supreme Court justice Janice M. Holder and held at the urging of Memphis mayor Jim Strickland. The mediation agreement laid out detailed specifications for the new park that were requested by Memphis in May. New plans for Tom Lee Park's redesign, designed to specifications requested by the festival, were unveiled in May 2020.

Several new controversies surrounding the MRPP have emerged since the beginning of the dispute with Memphis In May. In September 2019, the MRPP was caught dumping mud into the Mississippi River without a permit, prompting a response by the federal Corps of Engineers after the dumpings were exposed via a series of videos taken by concerned locals. The MRPP has been accused of poor maintenance of the riverfront parks under its control, with visitors noting broken down attractions, unmown lawns, and other signs of a lack of vigilant upkeep.

The Partnership has also been lauded for its work to transform the Memphis riverfront including formerly-Confederate parks. In March 2019, visitors from across the country came together in Memphis to tour "The Fourth Bluff", an area that includes River Garden, Fourth Bluff Park, Cossitt Library and parts of the River Line Trail. The national visitors applauded the "riverfront renaissance with a civic heart" that was evident with one park manager from Philadelphia claiming that the experience gave her goosebumps. 

Fourth Bluff Park - the second park to be transformed by the Partnership in 2019 - has been host to various art installations including the Peace Project, the work of artists from South Memphis as well as a temporary installation of public art by artists Hank Willis Thomas.  The park has become a popular civic gathering space and is the home of the Memphis Grizzlies official playoff watch parties bringing crowds of thousands of Memphians together to celebrate atop what was once home to a Confederate statue.  The work of the Partnership to not just remove Confederate monuments, but to find a vibrant post-monument future for these public spaces has been held up as an example for other cities struggling with how to animate places that once held Confederate monuments.

References

Non-profit organizations based in Tennessee
Organizations based in Memphis, Tennessee
Parks in Tennessee
Tourist attractions in Memphis, Tennessee
Organizations established in 2000